Jaclyn "Jackie" Barnes (born November 29, 1986) is an American goalball player. Although originally disinterested in the sport, fearing it was a "special" sport and new to losing her vision, she later embraced it. She was on the gold medal-winning US team in Goalball at the 2008 Summer Paralympics.

References 

Paralympic goalball players of the United States
Goalball players at the 2008 Summer Paralympics
Paralympic gold medalists for the United States
Medalists at the 2008 Summer Paralympics
1986 births
Living people
Paralympic medalists in goalball